Shankar Memorial National Cartoon Museum and Art Gallery is an art museum established by the Kerala Lalithakala Akademi under the Government of Kerala, India, in 2014, as a tribute to the renowned Indian cartoonist Shankar. The institution is situated at Krishnapuram in Kayamkulam which is the home town of Shankar, in Kerala.

References

2014 establishments in India
Art museums established in 2014
Art museums and galleries in India
Biographical museums in India
National museums of India
Museums devoted to one artist
Museums in Kerala
Cartooning museums